N,N-Diallyllysergamide (DAL, as the tartrate salt) is a psychedelic lysergamide. In their book TiHKAL, Alexander and Ann Shulgin describe it as being "an order of magnitude less potent than LSD itself".

References

Lysergamides
Serotonin receptor agonists
Allyl compounds